Seisdon was a rural district in Staffordshire, England from 1894 to 1974. It lays west of Wolverhampton and was formed under the Local Government Act 1894 based on the Seisdon rural sanitary district.

Villages in the district included Kinver, Wombourne, Codsall, Trysull and Pattingham.

In 1933, it was expanded to absorb the northern section of Kingswinford rural district, with the southern, more urban section of the district being absorbed into Brierley Hill. At the same time, a section of Penn was removed from Seisdon to be incorporated into Wolverhampton. A year later, part of the district was absorbed into Tettenhall.

In 1966, the village of Gospel End was transferred into Seisdon having previously been part of Sedgley. This reorganisation also involved a section of Brierley Hill being removed from Seisdon and, along with the bulk of Sedgley and Brierley Hill, being placed into an enlarged Dudley borough.

It continued in existence until 1 April 1974, when it was merged with the southern part of Cannock Rural District to form the South Staffordshire district.

References

History of Staffordshire
Districts of England abolished by the Local Government Act 1972
Districts of England created by the Local Government Act 1894
South Staffordshire District
Rural districts of England